Holt is an unincorporated community in Knox Township, Jefferson County, Ohio, United States.

The Mitchell's Salt Works Post Office was established on July 20, 1848. The name was changed to Holt Post Office on May 9, 1892, and the branch was discontinued on November 30, 1907. Mail service is now handled through the Hammondsville branch.

References

Unincorporated communities in Jefferson County, Ohio